"Louder (Put Your Hands Up)" is the second solo single by American singer Chris Willis. It's his first single without long-time collaborator David Guetta. The single peaked at number 1 on Hot Dance Club Songs and number 27 in Netherlands. It was written by Chris Willis, Jonas Jeberg, Cutfather, and it was produced by Jeberg and Cutfather with co-production by Willis.

Music video 

There is a music video for "Louder (Put Your Hands Up)" on YouTube.

Track list

AUS digital EP
 "Louder (Put Your Hands Up)" [original radio edit] – 3:29
 "Louder (Put Your Hands Up)" [original extended mix] – 7:30
 "Louder (Put Your Hands Up)" [Laurent Wolf mix] – 6:17

USA digital EP
 "Louder (Put Your Hands Up)" [original mix] – 3:29
 "Louder (Put Your Hands Up)" [Mixshow mix] – 4:49
 "Louder (Put Your Hands Up)" [extended mix] – 7:30
 "Louder (Put Your Hands Up)" [extended instrumental mix] – 4:45

The remixes
 "Louder (Put Your Hands Up)" [Laurent Wolf mix] – 6:17
 "Louder (Put Your Hands Up)" [Wawa mix] – 7:03
 "Louder (Put Your Hands Up)" [Mig and Rizzo extended mix] – 5:53
 "Louder (Put Your Hands Up)" [S.T.F.U. remix] –7:04
 "Louder (Put Your Hands Up)" [Simon De Jano + Steve Forest mix] 6:50
 "Louder (Put Your Hands Up)" [Ray Roc and Gabe Ramos remix] – 7:48
 "Louder (Put Your Hands Up)" [Eddie Amador remix] – 10:40
 "Louder (Put Your Hands Up)" [Cato K, Eran Hersh & Darmon Mixshow mix] – 5:36

UK digital EP
 "Louder (Put Your Hands Up)" [UK radio edit] – 2:50
 "Louder (Put Your Hands Up)" [extended mix] – 7:30
 "Louder (Put Your Hands Up)" [Jupiter Ace vocal remix] – 5:38
 "Louder (Put Your Hands Up)" [Whelan & Di Scala remix] – 5:34
 "Louder (Put Your Hands Up)" [STFU remix] – 7:04
 "Louder (Put Your Hands Up)" [Dante Black remix] – 5:40

UK remixes
 "Louder (Put Your Hands Up)" (Dave Silcox remix) – 4:51
 "Louder (Put Your Hands Up)" (7th Heaven remix) – 6:19
 "Louder (Put Your Hands Up)" (Zodiac remix) – 5:37
 "Louder (Put Your Hands Up)" (LMC remix) – 4:53
 "Louder (Put Your Hands Up)" (DJ Khama v DJ Montana) – 6:14
 "Louder (Put Your Hands Up)" (Klubfiller remix) – 5:50

Other versions
 7th Heaven radio edit – 3:37
 Craig C's Radio Blaster – 3:58
 Whelan & Di Scala edit – 3:54

Charts

Year-end charts

See also
 List of number-one dance singles of 2011 (U.S.)

References

External links
Chris Willis | MTV UK http://www.mtv.co.uk/chris-willis

2010 singles
Chris Willis songs
Songs written by Cutfather
Songs written by Jonas Jeberg
Songs written by Chris Willis
2010 songs